Strahinja Tanasijević (born 12 June 1997) is a Serbian professional footballer who plays for Čukarički. He is capable of playing as a central defender or as a full-back on the right flank.

Club career

Rad
Born in Mladenovac, Tanasijević started playing football with the same named club. He moved to FK Rad youth academy at the age of 11, where he later passed all categories. He signed his first scholarship contract in 2013, after which he extended the deal for two years in 2015. During the 2015–16 campaign, Tanasijević appeared in the UEFA Youth League and he was also licensed for the Serbian SuperLiga, where failed to make any appearance until the end of season. In summer 2016, after overgrown youth selection, Tanasijević was loaned to the satellite club Žarkovo, making 8 caps for the 2016–17 campaign in the Serbian League Belgrade as a bonus player. Returning to Rad, Tanasijević signed his first professional contract with the club in summer 2017, passing the whole pre-season under coach Gordan Petrić. Shortly after, Tanasijević moved on loan to the Serbian League West side Šumadija Aranđelovac, but after he missed opening matches, a deal was terminated and Tanasijević returned to Rad in last days of the summer transfer window.

Tanasijević became a full member of the first team since October 2017 under Slađan Nikolić. He made his official debut for Rad in 3–0 away defeat from Voždovac in 14 fixture of the 2017–18 Serbian SuperLiga campaign. As one of the most deserving home players for 1–0 victory over Napredak Kruševac on 4 November same year, Tanasijević was named in the team of the week in the Serbian SuperLiga.

Chievo
On the last day of January 2018, Tanasijević moved on six-month loan deal to Chievo, with an option to purchase the contract. Tanasijević stayed on the bench as an unused substitution in 37 fixture away match of the 2017–18 Serie A campaign, against Bologna. On 14 June 2018, Chievo permanently signed with Tanasijević, penning a deal that would keep him in the club until June 2021. At the beginning of the 2018–19 Serie A campaign, Tanasijević converted his squad number and took number 3 jersey.

On 19 July 2019, Tanasijević joined Ligue 2 club Paris FC on a one-year loan.

Čukarički
On 8 February 2021, he moved to Čukarički.

International career
Tanasijević was called into the Serbian under-19 national team in late 2015, under coach Branislav Nikolić. He was training with the team, but failed to make any appearance in the official competition.

Career statistics

Club

References

External links
 Strahinja Tanasijević at serbiacorner.com
 
 
 

1997 births
Living people
Footballers from Belgrade
Association football defenders
Serbian footballers
OFK Žarkovo players
FK Šumadija Aranđelovac players
FK Rad players
A.C. ChievoVerona players
Paris FC players
FK Čukarički players
Serbian SuperLiga players
Serie A players
Serbian expatriate footballers
Serbian expatriate sportspeople in Italy
Serbian expatriate sportspeople in France
Expatriate footballers in Italy
Expatriate footballers in France